The Ottoman journal Aşiyan (Arabic: آشیان; DMG: Āšiyān; English: "Home") was published in Istanbul between 1908 and 1909 in a total of 14 issues. The content focused on literary, scientific and political topics. One of the most famous writers of Aşiyan is Halide Edib Adıvar (1884-1964), a popular Turkish nationalist, writer and feminist. She published a range of articles that deal with the women's position in the Ottoman Empire, the modernization of women and the criticism of former politics.

References

External links

1908 establishments in the Ottoman Empire
1909 disestablishments in the Ottoman Empire
Defunct literary magazines
Defunct political magazines published in Turkey
Literary magazines published in Turkey
Magazines established in 1908
Magazines disestablished in 1909
Magazines published in Istanbul
Turkish-language magazines
Weekly magazines published in Turkey